Yesenia is a Mexican telenovela produced by Irene Sabido for Televisa in 1987. The protagonists of this telenovela were Adela Noriega and Luis Uribe, while Noe Murayama starred as antagonist.

Plot
Yesenia is a beautiful Roma woman who lives different situations in an aimlessly fixed way with the company of her caravan. In one of her many trips she meets a military man, Osvaldo Moncada, and falls in love with him.

They will have to prove that their love is stronger than their differences and social prejudice that separate them. One of the opponents of their relationship is Rashay, the patriarch of the Roma people, who opposes the relationship because the military youth does not belong to the Romani tribe.

Cast 
 Adela Noriega as Yesenia
 Luis Uribe as Osvaldo Moncada
 Ofelia Guilmain as Magenta
 Rafael Baledón as Don Julio
 Norma Herrera as Marisela
 Marisa De Lille as Luisita
 Rosario Gálvez as Amparo
 Raúl Román as Bardo
 Mónica Miguel as Trifenia
 Tony Carbajal as Ramón
 Juan Carlos Bonet
 Noe Murayama as El Patriarca Rashay
 Héctor Tellez as Marko
 Patricia Bernal as Orlanda
 José Ángel García as Ernesto
 Martha Zamora as Doña Casilda
 Luis as Fabián
 Rosario Zúñiga
 Martha Papadimitrioli

Awards

References

External links

1987 telenovelas
Female characters in comics
Mexican comics adapted into films
Mexican comics titles
Mexican telenovelas
1987 Mexican television series debuts
1987 Mexican television series endings
Spanish-language telenovelas
Television shows set in Mexico
Televisa telenovelas
Television shows based on comics
Fictional representations of Romani people